Miss Somalia is an annual beauty pageant held in Somalia that selects the country's representatives to the Miss World, Miss Supranational and Miss Global pageants. The current titleholder is Bahja Mohamoud from Beledweyne Iqra Ahmed Hassan from Jubaland. Fowsia Abdirashid Abdihakin from Puntland.

Titleholders

Somalian representatives at international pageants

Miss World Somalia

The winner of Miss Somalia automatically represents her country at Miss World.

Miss Earth Somalia

The winner of Miss Earth Somalia automatically represents her country at Miss Earth.

Miss Supranational Somalia

Since 2023, the winner of Miss Somalia automatically represents her country at Miss Supranational.

Miss Global Somalia

Since 2023, the first runner-up of Miss Somalia automatically represents her country at Miss Global.

References

External links
 

Miss World
Society of Somalia